Fosterovenator (meaning "Foster's hunter") is a genus of ceratosaur dinosaur known from the Late Jurassic Morrison Formation of Wyoming. The holotype is YPM VP 058267A, B, and C, a tibia with an articulated astragalus. An additional specimen is known, the paratype YPM VP 058267D, a fibula of a larger individual.

The holotype remains were in 1879 discovered by Arthur Lakes at Como Bluff, Wyoming, and consist of a nearly-complete right tibia with a co-ossified astragalus, probably of a juvenile. The overall shape of the known material is similar to that of Elaphrosaurus. However, ceratosaurian affinities of Fosterovenator (at least of the paratype) have been questioned.

Etymology
The generic name Fosterovenator was in 2014 named by S. G. Dalman for John Russell Foster and the Latin word venator ("hunter"). The specific name churei is named for Daniel J. Chure.

See also

 Timeline of ceratosaur research

References

Ceratosaurs
Late Jurassic dinosaurs of North America
Dinosaurs of the Morrison Formation
Fossil taxa described in 2014
Paleontology in Wyoming